Public Relations is a sociology book written by American pioneer in the field of public relations and propaganda, Edward Bernays, and first published in 1945.

References

Sources

External links

 
 

1945 non-fiction books
American autobiographies
Books about propaganda
Books about writing
Non-fiction books about public relations